James Blyth Shankly (19 June 1901 – 1972) was a Scottish professional footballer who is best remembered for his prolific goalscoring as a centre forward in the Football League for Southend United and Barrow. He also played English league football for Coventry City, Halifax Town, Sheffield United and Carlisle United.

Personal life 
Shankly's brothers Alec, Bill, John and Bob all became footballers. After retiring from football, he went into business as a coal merchant.

Career statistics

References 

Scottish footballers
Place of death missing
Footballers from East Ayrshire
Glenbuck Cherrypickers F.C. players
1901 births
1972 deaths
Association football forwards
English Football League players
Bedlington United A.F.C. players
Portsmouth F.C. players
Guildford City F.C. players
Halifax Town A.F.C. players
Nuneaton Borough F.C. players
Coventry City F.C. players
Carlisle United F.C. players
Sheffield United F.C. players
Southend United F.C. players
Barrow A.F.C. players
Southern Football League players